Thuniopsis is a genus of flowering plants belonging to the family Orchidaceae.

Its native range is China (Yunnan) to Myanmar.

Species:
 Thuniopsis cleistogama L.Li, D.P.Ye & Shi J.Li, 2015

References

Orchids
Orchid genera